is a fictional character in Nintendo's The Legend of Zelda series. She was introduced as a major character in the 2017 action-adventure game The Legend of Zelda: Breath of the Wild. She also appears as a playable character in the 2020 hack-and-slash video game Hyrule Warriors: Age of Calamity. Mipha is a princess of the Zora and one of the four Champions, including Urbosa, Revali and Daruk, who aid Princess Zelda and Link to fight against the threat of Calamity Ganon. Mipha pilots Divine Beast Vah Ruta, one of the four Divine Beasts that the Champions use to fight against Calamity Ganon. Mipha also has a unique set of skills related to the aquatic Zora, including the power to manipulate water in battle and the power to heal. Within the storyline of Breath of the Wild she displays romantic affections for the hero, Link. Since her introduction, Mipha has received a positive reception from critics for her tragic and complex character.

Concept and creation

Character design
Lead artist Hirohito Shinoda stated in development notes that he used a dolphin as the basis for Mipha's design. Cinematic designer Naoki Mori said that Mipha's relationship with Link was intended to be different to his relationship with Princess Zelda and commented that "it almost ended up being too intense. I tried to balance things by making her into a quieter person".

As a member of the Zora, Mipha is a humanoid character with design features that resemble a fish. She bears a tail fin on her head and other typical features of the amphibious Zora, that help her to live and swim in the waters of Zora's Domain with ease. She is quite short in stature when compared with other Hyrulean characters and smaller than the average Zora girl. When in combat, Mipha is depicted carrying her Lightscale Trident. In a Breath of the Wild behind-the-scenes interview, developer Aonuma-san commented that he is a fan of Mipha.

Portrayal
In both Breath of the Wild and Hyrule Warriors: Age of Calamity, the English voice actor for Mipha is Amelia Gotham. She is voiced by Mayu Isshiki in Japanese. Gotham auditioned for the part of Zelda, but was cast as the voice of Mipha instead.

Characteristics
Mipha is a Zora princess, being the daughter of King Dorephan, the ruler of Zora's Domain. She is also the pilot of the Divine Beast of water, Vah Ruta. Mipha has a deep bond with her younger brother, Prince Sidon who appears as a character in Breath of the Wild. As a member of Zora royalty, she is beloved by her people due to her kind, gentle and sensitive nature and the storyline makes it evident that the Zora miss her after her death. Mipha has a meek demeanour, but she is a skilled athlete and is renowned amongst the Zora for her abilities to use a spear and to effortlessly glide up and down waterfalls in Zora's Domain. She also has a powerful ability to heal. In Breath of the Wild, she bestows a unique healing skill upon Link named Mipha's Grace. In Hyrule Warriors: Age of Calamity, she is the only character who can heal herself. Mipha displays emotional and logical intelligence, which is evidenced by her ability to communicate with the other Champions as a team. In the backstory, she is educated by the Zora historian Jiahto, which gives her the knowledge required to rule a kingdom. As a child, Mipha is mentored by the Zora Royal Advisor, Muzu who cares for her like his own daughter, but despite their close connection, Mipha chooses to keep her love for Link a secret from him and also her intention to propose to Link. Despite her meekness, Mipha is incredibly brave, choosing to help Link to defeat a Lynel even before she is chosen as Champion. She is also incredibly perceptive and makes notes of her personal observations in her journal, many of which are about Link.

Appearances

The Legend of Zelda: Breath of the Wild
Mipha is introduced as one of the four Champions that Princess Zelda recruits to protect Hyrule against Calamity Ganon in the backstory of Breath of the Wild. Like the other Champions, she is the pilot of one of the four Divine Beasts. She pilots the Divine Beast of water, named Vah Ruta and is the first of the Champions to master her Divine Beast. Mipha, alongside the other three Champions, loses her life during the battle with Calamity Ganon. During the game, the backstory reveals that Mipha and Link were once childhood friends. In a cutscene that is one of Link's memories named "Mipha's Touch", Mipha reminisces with Link about their past and promises to always heal him. Mipha is shown to have romantic feelings for Link to such an extent that she makes Zora armour for him to wear. However, the storyline does not reveal whether Link returns her affections. She reappears in the present-day storyline as a spirit when Link wakes up 100 years later. When Link takes control of Divine Beast Vah Ruta, Mipha's spirit is set free, but despite her love for Link, she understands that she can never be with him. After Link defeats Waterblight Ganon and gains control of Vah Ruta, Mipha fulfils her promise to Link by bestowing a powerful healing skill named Mipha's Grace upon him. She apologises to her father for not returning safely and wishes that she could see her family again. Link honours her memory by wearing the Zora armour that she made for him and by aiding the Zora people.

Hyrule Warriors: Age of Calamity
In Hyrule Warriors: Age of Calamity, Mipha returns as a playable character. She wields the Lightscale Trident or Zora Spear in battle and has the ability to heal herself and her allies on the battlefield. She also uses her skill to manipulate water to create water-based attacks. The game acts as a prequel to Breath of the Wild, with the storyline recounting the Champions' first failed attempt to defeat Calamity Ganon 100 years earlier. The storyline begins with Zelda's small Guardian Terrako travelling through a portal into the past to warn Zelda about the future. Zelda then goes on a quest to recruit a roster of characters to help protect Hyrule. Mipha plays a major role in the storyline as she is one of the four Champions recruited to pilot one of the Divine Beasts. During a cutscene, Mipha bravely accepts her role as the Zora Champion, although her father King Dorephan says that it is only on the condition that she returns safely. In contrast to her story arc in Breath of the Wild, Mipha's love for Link is less significant in the storyline of Hyrule Warriors: Age of Calamity. The devastating impact of Mipha's death on her brother Sidon is shown to be still evident, as he sometimes displays signs of heartache when her death is mentioned during gameplay.

Other media
Mipha also makes an appearance in Super Smash Bros. Ultimate as a Spirit.

Merchandise
For Breath of the Wild, Nintendo released an amiibo of Mipha, which was reprinted for the launch of Hyrule Warriors: Age of Calamity.

Reception
Mipha has received a positive reception from fans and critics. Madeline Carpou for Screen Rant opined that Mipha is a "fascinating, complex character" and "a beloved character in the Zelda franchise and one of the most memorable figures in Breath Of The Wild". Carpou also opined that Mipha is "one of the most tragic characters in the game", because "she never got the chance to tell Link just how much she loved him". Jessica Filby for Screen Rant listed Mipha in seventh place on a list of Breath Of The Wild characters based on likability, in which she commented that Mipha "plays a huge part in the storyline and Links adventure, which only works to strengthen and improve the love many players have for her. She is the perfect representation of excellence and power, something the people of Hyrule and her brother definitely recognize and respect". The Outerhaven included Mipha in a list of "Favourite Legend of Zelda Characters" because "she had the backstory you cried over". Daniel Alexander for The Gamer ranked Mipha in third place on a list of "The 10 Best New Characters In Breath Of The Wild" noting her "nurturing personality and love for Link". Mipha was also listed by The Gamer in second place in a list of "The 10 Strongest Women in the Zelda Series", noting her fighting skills with a spear, her healing ability and her relationship with Link. Callum Archer for The Gamer remarked on Mipha's skills in Hyrule Warriors: Age of Calamity, by saying that she is "one of the strongest characters in the game in almost every regard". Game Rant described Mipha as "a beloved character" and an inspirational member of the Zora royal family that serves a crucial role over Link's journey in Breath of the Wild. Due to Mipha's popularity as a character, she has been the subject of numerous works of fan art, cosplay, tweets and memes that have centered around her physically attractive qualities.

See also
 Characters of The Legend of Zelda

Notes

References

Female characters in video games
Fictional characters with healing abilities
Fictional murdered people
The Legend of Zelda characters
Nintendo protagonists
Princess characters in video games
Video game characters with water abilities
Video game characters introduced in 2017
Video game characters with accelerated healing
Fictional characters with slowed ageing
Woman soldier and warrior characters in video games
Fictional polearm and spearfighters
Fictional princesses
Princesses